Raisbeck is a hamlet in the civil parish of Orton, in the Eden district, in the county of Cumbria, England. The surname Raisbeck originates from the hamlet. The name of the hamlet derives from Hrridarr, a personal name and beck, a stream or river, the surname is used by people such as Alex Raisbeck, Rosina Raisbeck and Bill Raisbeck. There is also the smaller hamlet of Sunbiggin nearby. Circa 1870, it had a population of 214 as recorded in the Imperial Gazetteer of England and Wales.

Northwest of the hamlet is the Gamelands stone circle.

See also

Listed buildings in Orton, Eden

References

External links
 Cumbria County History Trust: Orton (nb: provisional research only – see Talk page)

Hamlets in Cumbria
Orton, Eden